Henry George Simpson (Born 1822  - Died 30 August 1898 ) was a Member of the Queensland Legislative Council.

Early life
Simpson was born at Bexhill-on-Sea, Sussex, England in 1822 to the Rev H.W. Simpson and his wife Elizabeth. After completing his schooling at Dartmouth he joined the Royal Navy.

From 1846 till 1850, Simpson was promoted to lieutenant and stationed in the East Indies aboard . By the time he had retired from the navy in 1863, Simpson had been promoted to commander. In 1865, Simpson arrived in Queensland and within a year had been made Commissioner of Crown Lands.

Politics
Simpson was appointed to the Queensland Legislative Council on 29 July 1868 and served for 14 years before resigning on 29 April 1882 . During this time he became a member of the Marine Board of Queensland in 1869, the Central Board of Health in 1874, and was a member of the Royal Commission for Improving the Navigation of Moreton Bay.

Personal life
In 1855, Simpson married Eliza Lamb in South Africa. He returned to England in 1883 and died in Worthing, Sussex in 1898.

References

Further reading
 

1822 births
1898 deaths
People from Bexhill-on-Sea
English emigrants to Australia
Royal Navy officers
Members of the Queensland Legislative Council
19th-century Australian politicians